The Catenicellidae are a family of bryozoans in the suborder Ascophora.

Genera include:

 Bryosartor
 Calpidium
 Catenicella
 Claviporella
 Cornuticella
 Cornuticellina
 Costaticella
 Cribricellina
 Orthoscuticella
 Paracribricellina
 Plagiopora
 Pterocella
 Scalicella
 Scuticella
 Strongylopora
 Strophipora
 Talivittaticella
 Terminocella
 Vasignyella

References 

Bryozoan families
Cheilostomatida
Extant Late Cretaceous first appearances